Resurrection in Blood is the third album by Runemagick released in 2000 on Century Media.

Track listing
  "Resurrection of the Dark Lord"   – 0:30  
  "Reborn in Necromancy"   – 5:15  
  "Death Collector"   – 3:57  
  "Dark Dead Earth"   – 4:54  
  "Lord of the Grave"   – 5:54  
  "Choir of Hades (Intro)"   – 0:31  
  "Resurrection in Blood"   – 6:47  
  "Hail Death"   – 4:34  
  "Dominion of the Necrogods"   – 5:09  
  "Demonstrosity"   – 6:10  
  "The Gates of Hades (Intro)"   – 0:55  
  "Return of the Reaper"   – 4:15  
  "Celebration of Death (Outro)"   – 1:18

Credits
 Nicklas "Terror" Rudolfsson - Vocals, Guitar, Drums, Bass, Keyboards
 Fredrik Johnsson - Guitar
 Billy Mellström - Keyboards
 Axel Hermann - Cover artwork

Runemagick albums
1999 albums
Century Media Records albums